The Thailand National Games is a national multi-sport event held every two years among athletes from all over Thailand. The Games were regulated by the Organization of the Sport of Thailand (OST) from the first games in Bangkok, Thailand, from the 1967 games until the 1984 games. Since the 1985 games, they have been organized by the Sports Authority of Thailand (SAT), after the breakup of the Organization of the Sport of Thailand. The games are recognized by the Ministry of Tourism and Sports are described as the largest multi-sport event in Thailand.

In its history, twenty-six province have hosted the National Games. Seventy-seven provinces have participated in the games, including Bueng Kan, which was the latest participant in 2011.

The last games was held in Chiang Rai, Thailand in 2018.

History

Formation
Thailand National Games, formerly known as "Thailand Regional Games" organized by the Organization of the Sport of Thailand (OST; Currently, the Sports Authority of Thailand; SAT) to qualified Thai athletes to 1967 Southeast Asian Peninsular Games held in Bangkok, Thailand. The first Thailand Regional Games held in Bangkok from 1 to 5 November 1967, the competition was represented from five regions. After that, The fifth Thailand Regional Games was added from 5 to 10 regions by Bangkok moved from the Region 1 to the Region 10.

In 1984, the Organization of the Sport of Thailand committee was renamed to "Thailand National Games" and used in 1985 Games, with changed the objective of the Thailand National Games to make the strengthen of Thai sport.

On 23 February 1999, the Thai cabinet agreed with Sports Authority of Thailand (SAT) was to hosted the Thailand National Games every two years in 2002, 2004 and 2006, the games was represented from 10 regions to 76 provinces.

However, the Thai cabinet in 2006 agreed with Sports Authority of Thailand (SAT) was to hosted the Thailand National Games every year from two years in 2007, because to continuation in the development of the Thai sport but also represented by the provinces.

On 26 July 2013, the Thai cabinet assembled at the Sports Authority of Thailand congress and agreed that the Thailand National Games should be held every two years instead of one year beginning 2018 onwards, because at present time, many national and international events affect the rehearse and budget needed to send the athletes to the events.

Crisis
In 1978 Games was postponed by the 1978 Udon Thani floods because the publics was afflicted to shortage the consumer goods and needed time to restore the conditions after the flood, until the Udon Thani 1978 Organising Committee was postponed this competition from October 1978 to January 1979.

In 2011 Games was postponed by the 2011 Thailand floods because the publics was afflicted to shortage the consumer goods and needed time to restore the conditions after the flood and the athletes wasn't rehearse to this event, until the Khon Kaen 2011 Organising Committee was postponed this competition from November 2011 to March 2012.

In 2015 the Games opening ceremony was postponed from 11 December 2015 to 12 December 2015 due to the Bike for dad event, while the 2016 games was cancelled due to King Bhumibol's passing.

Royal flame 
Royal flame is the flame from the King to light the cauldron during competitions. The flame was introduced at the 1967 Thailand Regional Games in Bangkok. The Organizing committee must contact the Office of His Majesty's Principal Private Secretary to receive the flame. After His Majesty the King knew the contact, the governor of the host will receive the flame from the King at the palace.

The flame was lit at Wat Phra Si Rattana Satsadaram in Bangkok once a year. This flame use for the royal ceremony, cremation ceremony or the sport event ceremony include the Southeast Asian Games, Asian Games, Summer Universiade etc.

Provincial Sports Associations

Zone I (East and Bangkok)

Zone II (Central and West)

Zone III (Northeast)

Zone IV (South)

Zone V (North)

Former team

Sports

Editions

Gold medal tally

Notes

References

External links
Official Website of the 35th National Games in Suphan Buri
Official Website of the 36th National Games in Nakhon Si Thammarat
Official Website of the 37th National Games in Phitsanulok
http://www.songkhlagames.com/main  
Sports Authority of Thailand

 
1967 establishments in Thailand
National Games
Thailand
Recurring sporting events established in 1967